Katharina Elisabeth Tuxen Meyer (b. 19 July 1859, d. 4 July 1927) was a Danish composer. She was born in Svendborg, Denmark, sister of singer Marie English. She studied music with her mother and possibly composers Hans Jørgen Malling and Ludwig Birkedal Barford. She married and had four children, and died in Copenhagen. She published under the name Elisabeth Tuxen.

Works
Meyer wrote about sixty songs and a cantata (lost). Selected works include:
The Lark
Berceuse for violin and pianoforte
Naar Duggen falder for pianoforte

References

1859 births
1927 deaths
20th-century classical composers
Women classical composers
Danish classical composers
People from Svendborg
Danish women composers
20th-century women composers